Slusser is a surname. Notable people with the surname include:

George Edgar Slusser (1939–2014), American scholar, professor, and writer
James Slusser (1916–?), American police officer
Jean Paul Slusser (1886–1981), painter, designer, art critic, and professor
Susan Slusser, American sportswriter